Svitlana Frishko (born 1976) is a Ukrainian football striker, currently playing for Zhilstroy-1 Kharkiv in the Ukrainian League. She has also played in the Russian Championship for Spartak Moscow, Nadezhda Noginsk and SKA Rostov.

She has been a member of the Ukrainian national team since its first match in August 1993, and was called up for the 2009 European Championship though she didn't play.

She was officially recognized as the best woman football player of Ukraine of the 20th century.

References

1976 births
Living people
Footballers from Odesa
Ukrainian women's footballers
WFC Zhytlobud-1 Kharkiv players
WFC Donchanka Donetsk players
WFC Dynamo Kyiv players
WFC Chornomorochka Odesa players
WFC Mariupolchanka Mariupol players
WFC Pantery Uman players
Expatriate women's footballers in Russia
Nadezhda Noginsk players
SKA Rostov-on-Don (women) players
Expatriate women's footballers in Moldova
Ukraine women's international footballers
Women's association football forwards
Ukrainian expatriate sportspeople in Russia
Ukrainian expatriate sportspeople in Moldova